House of Shem is a roots reggae band from New Zealand. They have had songs featured on the Conscious Roots compilations. In May 2008, their debut album, Keep Rising was released throughout New Zealand. It was released again in April 2009 throughout Australia and Hawaii.

In April 2010, House of Shem started recording their second album Island Vibration with engineer and producer Errol Brown who has worked with many well known reggae bands and artists such as Alton Ellis, Bob Marley & The Wailers, Gregory Isaacs, Peter Tosh and Ziggy Marley and The Melody Makers. The album was released in New Zealand on 14 February 2011.

In 2013, they released their third album, Harmony, on which they worked with Jamaican engineer Errol Brown.

Band members
Carl Perkins – Vocals/Producer (died on 9 May 2018 from bowel cancer).
Te Omeka Perkins – Vocals/Producer
Isaiah Perkins – Vocals/Producer

Discography

Albums

Compilations

References

External links

New Zealand reggae musical groups
Pacific reggae